Jean-Philippe Lafont (born 11 February 1951) is a French baritone. He studied in his native city of Toulouse and later at the Opéra-Studio in Paris. He made his operatic debut as Papageno in The Magic Flute at the Salle Favart, Paris in 1974. He went on to appear regularly in Toulouse, where he first played the title role in Verdi's Falstaff in 1987.
 
Lafont has performed at the Opéra-Comique in Paris, Carnegie Hall and the Metropolitan Opera in New York, La Scala in Milan and the Royal Opera House, London. Among the roles with which he is particularly associated are the four villains in The Tales of Hoffmann, the Comte des Grieux in Manon, Golaud in Pelléas et Mélisande, Barak in Die Frau ohne Schatten and the title roles in Gianni Schicchi, Rigoletto, Boris Godunov and Macbeth.

His discography includes:
 Auber: La muette de Portici
 Berlioz: La Damnation de Faust 
 Bizet: Djamileh
 Debussy: La chute de la maison Usher 
 Escaich: Claude
 Gluck: Les Pélerins de la Mecque 
 Gounod: Messe Solennelle de Sainte Cécile  
 Offenbach: La Belle Hélène
 Offenbach: Mesdames de la Halle
 Offenbach: Monsieur Choufleuri
 Offenbach: Pomme d'Api
 Salieri: Les Danaïdes 
 Salieri: Tarare 
 Verdi: Falstaff

Filmography
 1984 Carmen (Dancaïre)
 1985 Parole de flic (Ranko)
 1987 Babette's Feast (Achille Papin)
as well as French television J'étais à Nüremberg (2011), La Guerre du Royal Palace (2012) and Ceux de 14 (2014)

Notes

1951 births
Living people
French operatic baritones